Terrence Mashego (born 23 June 1998) is a South African professional soccer player who plays as a defender for South African Premier Division club Mamelodi Sundowns and the South African national team.

Club career
Mashego was born in Mamelodi, Gauteng. He joined Arcadia Shepherds' youth set-up in 2006. Mashego attended Bona Lesedi Secondary School, completing his education in 2014. He attended Tshwane University of Technology through a sports scholarship from 2016, combining study with playing for their football team but left after 8 months and signed for National First Division club Mthatha Bucks. He made one appearance for Bucks in the 2016–17 season and 10 appearances in the 2017–18 season.

Mashego joined newly formed National First Division club TS Galaxy in 2018. He won the 2018–19 Nedbank Cup with Galaxy after the club beat Kaizer Chiefs in May 2019.

In October 2020, Mashego signed for South African Premier Division club Cape Town City.

International career
Mashego received his first call-up to the South Africa national soccer team for World Cup qualification fixtures against Ethiopia in October 2021. He made his debut for South Africa in the 3–1 win over Ethiopia on 9 October.

Honours
TS Galaxy
Nedbank Cup: 2018–19

References

External links

1998 births
Living people
South African soccer players
People from Mamelodi
Soccer players from Gauteng
Association football defenders
Mthatha Bucks F.C. players
TS Galaxy F.C. players
Cape Town City F.C. (2016) players
Mamelodi Sundowns F.C. players
National First Division players
South African Premier Division players
South Africa international soccer players